The Bandun Man were an ancient people living along the Jialing River valley, in the area of modern Langzhong in Sichuan, China. Their name, literally meaning "board shield barbarians", is derived from their fighting style of charging with shields to break the enemy line. They were also called the Bohu Yi (白虎夷), meaning the "white tiger barbarians".

In the second century CE, the Bandun Man converted to the Way of the Five Pecks of Rice.

See also 
 Nanman

Ancient peoples of China
History of Sichuan